Hogback Outlier is an Ancestral Puebloan outlier community located  northwest of Chaco Culture National Historical Park, New Mexico. The community features a great house, great kiva, and thirty-five small house sites.

References

Bibliography

Colorado Plateau
Ancestral Puebloans
Post-Archaic period in North America
Archaeological sites in New Mexico
Chaco Canyon
Chaco Culture National Historical Park